The Greyhound is a pub at 1 Kensington Square, Kensington, London W8.

It is a Grade II listed building, built in about 1899.

References

External links
 

Grade II listed pubs in London
Grade II listed buildings in the Royal Borough of Kensington and Chelsea
Pubs in the Royal Borough of Kensington and Chelsea